James Renforth  (7 April 1842 – 23 August 1871) was an English Tyneside professional oarsman. He became the World Sculling Champion in 1868 and was one of three great Tyneside oarsmen, the other two being Harry Clasper and Robert Chambers.

Early history
He was born to James and Jane Renforth in New Pandon Street in the Manors district of Newcastle upon Tyne. The year after his birth, his family moved to Rabbit Banks in the Pipewellgate area of Gateshead.

His father was an anchorsmith and the young James became employed as a smith's striker at the age of about 11. The work involved swinging a heavy hammer to strike pieces hot metal of positioned by the smith. The job was physically demanding, but developed his upper body muscles and his stamina, something that served him well in his later career.

There is some doubt over the next stage in his career. There are claims that he joined the army at the age of 21 and travelled abroad. However, other claims state that there is evidence that he remained on Tyneside.

In 1861, he married Mary Ann Bell in Newcastle. In 1862, Mary gave birth to a daughter, Margaret, Jane. They were living at Dean Court, Newcastle. In 1863, Margaret, Jane died of bronchitis. That same year, a second daughter, Ann Elizabeth, was born. The family were living at Tuthill Stairs, Newcastle.

In 1866, Renforth was employed on the demolition of the old Tyne Bridge, ferrying men and materials back and forth. This may have first given him the idea to take up competitive rowing as a means to make more money and help support his wife and child.

In 1868, a third daughter, called Margaret Jane was born; the child died later that year. The family were now living at Church Street, Gateshead.

Sculling career
Renforth made his debut in 1866, in a sculling race and won easily. He won a succession of other sculling races and began to have difficulty in finding opponents who would take him on. He therefore entered several local regattas, which paid smaller prize money. His career took a marked upward turn when he entered for a sculling race at the Thames Regatta in 1868. Renforth won the race, beating Harry Kelley amongst others and received a £90 prize. Tyne crews also won the fours and pairs at the same regatta.

Renforth's victory at the Thames Regatta had catapulted him into prominence as a sculler. Kelley was the current World Sculling Champion and Renforth was the obvious contender, so a match was arranged between the two men. The race was to be over the Putney to Mortlake on the Thames and was to be rowed in November 1868. Renforth trained hard for the race and, in the event, won it easily, by four lengths. He became the new World Champion, a title he held until his death in 1871. See also English Sculling Championship.

Later career
In 1869, Renforth became the landlord of the Belted Will Inn on Scotswood Road, Newcastle, a career move that both Clasper and Chambers had made before him. After six months, in 1870, he moved on, to take over the Sir Charles Napier Inn, Queen Street, Newcastle.

In July 1870, Clasper died and Renforth was a pall-bearer at his funeral.

Renforth had begun to race in pairs and fours, perhaps because of the difficulty of finding opponents as a sculler. He became stroke of the Tyne Champion Four and, with this crew, defeated a London crew on both the Thames and the Tyne in November 1869. As when he was sculling, Renforth began to have difficulty in finding opponents who would race against him.

Racing in Canada
A challenge was received from Canada to race a crew of four fishermen from Saint John, New Brunswick.  This crew had already competed successfully at the Paris Regatta and were known locally and internationally as the "Paris Crew". The challenge was accepted and Renforth's crew travelled to Canada in August 1870. The race was held at Lachine, near Montreal, Quebec, in September, and the Tyne crew won easily. Due to the high level of betting, the Tyne crewmembers made rather a financial killing. They received an enthusiastic reception on their return home.

However, during the preparations for the race there had been a difference of opinion that led to a split within the crew upon their return. Two boats had been taken and whilst Renforth favoured one, the bowman and coach, James Taylor, favoured the other. Renforth had prevailed, but this led to bitterness and so the crew split up, leaving Renforth crewless.

Final race
Renforth promptly formed a new crew, which included his old sculling rival Kelley. In 1871, he accepted another challenge from the Canadians to race in Canada, and the crew prepared to travel to Saint John, New Brunswick. The race was to take place over six miles on the Kennebecasis River. It was rowed on 23 August starting at seven in the morning.

The Saint John crew were first away from the start but were soon half a length down. They started to come back at the English crew and at that point it was noticed that something was wrong with Renforth's rowing. He was swaying from side to side and not producing any effort. He finally collapsed into the lap of the rower behind him. The other crewmembers brought the boat ashore, where he was attended by two doctors but was pronounced dead.
His last words were reputed to be, "What will they say in England".

A post-mortem found nothing unusual, but rumours persisted of poison. The most likely cause of his death is heart failure, perhaps brought on by an epileptic seizure. He had been known to collapse with a seizure after a race in the past.

An account of his final race and subsequent death was published in the Newcastle Daily Chronicle on 12 July 1871:

Burial and legacy

His body was brought home to Tyneside and he was buried in St Edmund's Cemetery, Gateshead. It was claimed that 100,000 mourners attended his funeral. It is true to say that Tyneside was shocked by the death of a 29-year-old athlete in his prime, especially so soon after the deaths of Chambers in 1868 and Clasper in 1870. As with the other two oarsmen, a funeral monument was commissioned to stand over his grave. In 1992, it was restored and moved to a site outside the Shipley Art Gallery in Gateshead, where it remains.

Renforth's name was not forgotten in Canada. The community in which his last race took place in New Brunswick was named Renforth in his honour.

See also

 List of people from Newcastle upon Tyne

References

External links
 The Resurfacing of James Renforth's Sculls and the 1871 Tyne Four's Oars
 N.E.Rowing - History Timeline for a timeline of Renforth's life

Bibliography

 Whitehead, Ian (2002). The Sporting Tyne.  .
 Whitehead, Ian (2004). James Renforth of Gateshead, Champion Sculler of the World. .

1842 births
1871 deaths
19th-century English people
19th-century sportsmen
Burials in Tyne and Wear
English expatriates in Canada
English male rowers
Sport deaths in Canada
Sportspeople from Newcastle upon Tyne
Sportspeople from Gateshead